X Dinero (For Money in English) is a rock-ska band from Peru formed in 1986.

Biography
The band formed after band Baretto had separated, so they set out to form their own band and record their own songs. They signed with local label IEMPSA.
The band XDinero was successful in the north of Peru, its success was so great that it reached the capital Lima (which is very difficult for bands from outside of Lima). They toured in Europe and Latin America. The band escaped death on a bus route to aconcert in Ica. 
The band still tours in Peru

Discography

Studio albums
 Triste Realidad (1997)
 Por Las Huevas (2001)
 Tocar Fondo y Brillar  (2013)

References

External links 
XDinero's official homepage

Peruvian rock music groups
Ska groups
Musical groups established in 1986
1986 establishments in Peru